Pubic Fruit is a compilation album by English alternative rock band Curve. It was released exclusively in the United States on 17 November 1992 by Anxious Records and Charisma Records. The album compiles the band's first three EPs, as well as the extended version of their song "Faît Accompli".

Release
Curve released three critically acclaimed EPs – Blindfold, Frozen and Cherry – in the United Kingdom throughout 1991. None of the tracks from these EPs were included on the band's 1992 debut studio album Doppelgänger, with the exception of "Clipped", which was added to the American pressing of the album. Released exclusively in the United States by Anxious Records and Charisma Records on 17 November 1992, after Doppelgänger, Pubic Fruit compiles the three EPs, which had only been issued in the UK. The compilation also includes the extended version of the Doppelgänger track "Faît Accompli" (first released as a single in 1992), which likewise had not yet been commercially released in the US.

Critical reception

In 2016, Pitchfork ranked Pubic Fruit at number 19 on its list of the 50 best shoegaze albums of all time.

Track listing

Personnel
Credits are adapted from the album's liner notes.

Curve
 Dean Garcia
 Toni Halliday

Production
 Darren Allison – mixing (assistant)
 Curve – production
 Flood – production
 Dick Meaney – mixing (assistant)
 Alan Moulder – mixing
 Steve Osborne – production
 Ronan Tal – mixing (assistant)
 Ingo Vauk – engineering

Design
 Flat Earth – design, photography
 Barry Freidlander – photography
 Barry Maguire – photography
 Clare Muller – photography
 Dave Stewart – photography
 J. P. Wombbaby – photography

References

External links
 
 

1992 compilation albums
Curve (band) compilation albums
Albums produced by Steve Osborne
Albums produced by Flood (producer)
Charisma Records compilation albums